Leonard M Norris (born 1951), is a male former swimmer who competed for England.

Swimming career
Norris became the British champion in 1967 when he won the 110 yards butterfly title at the ASA National British Championships in Blackpool.

He represented England in the butterfly and medley events, at the 1970 British Commonwealth Games in Edinburgh, Scotland.

He swan for the Barracuda Swimming Club, Wimbledon.

References

1951 births
English male swimmers
Swimmers at the 1970 British Commonwealth Games
Living people
Commonwealth Games competitors for England